São Sebastião is a municipality located in the Brazilian state of Alagoas. Its population was 34,290 (2020) and its area is 306 km2.

References

Municipalities in Alagoas